The Institute of Statistical Mathematics is Japan's national research institute for statistical science. In October 2009, it relocated from the Azabu district of Tokyo to Tachikawa. Founded in 1944, since 2004 it has been part of the Research Organization of Information and Systems.

The Institute is represented on the national Coordinating Committee for Earthquake Prediction.

Notable faculty 
Hirotugu Akaike
Motosaburo Masuyama
Joichi Suetsuna
Genichi Taguchi

Publications 
The Institute publishes the scientific journal Annals of the Institute of Statistical Mathematics and the time series analysis software package TIMSAC.

References

External links 

 Official website

Mathematical institutes
Research institutes in Japan
National statistical services
1944 establishments in Japan
Organizations established in 1944